The DC Chronicles is a line of trade paperbacks, chronologically  reprinting the earliest stories (based on publication dates) starring some of the best-known DC Comics superheroes.

Stories are reprinted in color with no ads, providing readers access to original Golden and Silver Age comic book stories which had previously been reprinted in the DC Archive Editions format. The volumes were priced significantly lower than the Archives series in order to be more affordable for the reader, with each one typically priced at $14.99 USD. 

The final volumes were released in 2013. Since then, DC has been re-publishing these stories in the same chronological format in the bigger DC Omnibus series. Each Age era Omnibus volume is also published as two or three (depending on page count) trade paperbacks.

Publications

The Batman Chronicles

 The Batman Chronicles Volume 1 collects Detective Comics #27–38 and Batman #1, April 2005, 
 The Batman Chronicles Volume 2 collects Detective Comics #39–45, Batman #2–3, and The New York World's Fair Comics #2, September 2006, 
 The Batman Chronicles Volume 3 collects Detective Comics #46–50, Batman #4–5, and World's Best Comics #1, May 2007, 
 The Batman Chronicles Volume 4 collects Detective Comics #51–56, Batman #6–7, and World's Finest Comics #2–3, October 2007, 
 The Batman Chronicles Volume 5 collects Detective Comics #57–61, Batman #8–9, and World's Finest Comics #4, April 2008, 
 The Batman Chronicles Volume 6 collects Detective Comics #62–65, Batman #10–11, and World's Finest Comics #5–6, October 2008, 
 The Batman Chronicles Volume 7 collects Detective Comics #66–70, Batman #12–13, and World's Finest Comics #7, March 2009, 
 The Batman Chronicles Volume 8 collects Detective Comics #71–74, Batman #14–15, and World's Finest Comics #8–9, October 2009, 
 The Batman Chronicles Volume 9 collects Detective Comics #75–77, Batman #16–17, and World's Finest Comics #10, March 2010, 
 The Batman Chronicles Volume 10 collects Detective Comics #78–81, Batman #18–19, and World's Finest Comics #11, December 2010, 
 The Batman Chronicles Volume 11 collects Detective Comics #82–85, Batman #20–21, and World's Finest Comics #12, January 2013,

The Superman Chronicles

This series is technically incomplete due to Volume 8 missing the story from World's Finest Comics #5. 
 The Superman Chronicles Volume 1 collects material from Action Comics #1–13, The New York World's Fair Comics #1, and Superman #1; February 2006; 
 The Superman Chronicles Volume 2 collects material from Action Comics #14–20, and Superman #2–3; February 2007; 
 The Superman Chronicles Volume 3 collects material from Action Comics #21–25, Superman #4–5, and The New York World's Fair Comics #2; August 2007; 
 The Superman Chronicles Volume 4 collects material from Action Comics #26–31, and Superman #6–7; February 2008; 
 The Superman Chronicles Volume 5 collects material from Action Comics #32–36, Superman #8–9, and World's Best Comics #1; August 2008; 
 The Superman Chronicles Volume 6 collects material from Action Comics #37–40, Superman #10–11, and World's Finest Comics #2–3; February 2009; 
 The Superman Chronicles Volume 7 collects material from Action Comics #41–43, Superman #12–13, and World's Finest Comics #4; July 2009; 
 The Superman Chronicles Volume 8 collects material from Action Comics #44–47, and Superman #14–15; April 2010; 
 The Superman Chronicles Volume 9 collects material from Action Comics #48–52, Superman #16–17, and World's Finest Comics #6; June 2011; 
The Superman Chronicles Volume 10 collects material from Action Comics #53–55, Superman #18–19, and World's Finest Comics #7; September 2012;

The Green Lantern Chronicles

Collecting the stories starring the Silver Age Green Lantern (Hal Jordan).
 The Green Lantern Chronicles Volume 1 collects material from Showcase #22–24, and Green Lantern (vol. 2) #1–3; May 2009; 
 The Green Lantern Chronicles Volume 2 collects Green Lantern (vol. 2) #4–9; December 2009; 
 The Green Lantern Chronicles Volume 3 collects Green Lantern (vol. 2) #10–14, and The Flash #131; October 2010; 
 The Green Lantern Chronicles Volume 4 collects Green Lantern (vol. 2) #15–20; March 2012;

The Flash Chronicles

Collecting the stories starring the Silver Age Flash (Barry Allen).
 The Flash Chronicles Volume 1 collects material from Showcase #4, 8, 13–14; and The Flash #105–106; September 2009; original: October 1956-May 1959;
 The Flash Chronicles Volume 2 collects material from The Flash #107–112; September 2010; original: July 1959-May 1960;
 The Flash Chronicles Volume 3 collects material from The Flash #113–118; August 2012; original: July 1960-February 1961; 
 The Flash Chronicles Volume 4 collects material from The Flash #119–124; April 2013; original: March 1961-November 1961;

The Wonder Woman Chronicles

 The Wonder Woman Chronicles Volume 1 collects material from All Star Comics #8, Sensation Comics #1–9, and Wonder Woman #1; March 23, 2010; 
 The Wonder Woman Chronicles Volume 2 collects material from Wonder Woman #2–3, Sensation Comics #10–14, and Comic Cavalcade #1; December 6, 2011; 
 The Wonder Woman Chronicles Volume 3 collects material from Wonder Woman #4–5, Sensation Comics #15–18, and Comic Cavalcade #2; December 4, 2012;

See also
 List of comic books on CD/DVD

References

Comic book collection books
DC Comics lines